Shaziman bin Abu Mansor (Jawi: شاه عظيمان بن ابو منصور; born 20 January 1964) is a Malaysian politician, a prominent member of the United Malays National Organisation (UMNO), a component party of Barisan Nasional (BN) coalition. He is also the former Works Minister of Malaysia.

Early life 
Born as a son of a Malayan Railway worker in Ipoh, Perak who hailed from Rembau, Negeri Sembilan, Shaziman was raised in Tampin, Negeri Sembilan, having receiving primary education at Tunku Besar Tampin Primary School and he holds a Bachelor of Science in Civil Engineering from Tri-State University (now Trine University), Angola, Indiana, USA and a Diploma in Civil Engineering from Universiti Teknologi Malaysia in Skudai, Johor Bahru, Johor.

Political career 
Shaziman entered Malaysian politics in 1991, at the age of 27 years, as a member of the Tampin Bandar branch of UMNO in Tampin. Shaziman rose within the ranks of UMNO until he was picked as the head of UMNO Youth in 1997, followed by his appointment as the head of Tampin UMNO division in 2000.

Shaziman was chosen as a candidate for the 1999 general election, contesting for the Tampin parliamentary seat against Hamdan Hashim of Pan-Malaysian Islamic Party (PAS) and winning by a majority of 9,979 votes. Shaziman successfully retained his seat in the next three general elections, defeating Abdul Razakek Abdul Rahim of PAS in 2004, 2008 and 2013. In 2004, Shaziman won by a clear majority of 18,084 votes (against 5,852 votes for Abdul Razakek); 2008 saw a lower share of votes in favour of Shaziman, with 13,079 votes (against 10,943 votes for Abdul Razakek) and 11,162 majority in 2013. In the 2018 election, Shaziman lost to Hasan Baharom of Parti Amanah Negara (AMANAH), in a three-corner fight with PAS's Abdul Razakek for the Tampin parliamentary seat.

After the 2004 general election, Shaziman was included into the Cabinet of Malaysia as the Deputy Minister of Energy, Water and Communications, under the leadership of Energy, Water and Communications Minister Lim Keng Yaik. Following Lim's announcement of his retirement as the President of Parti Gerakan Rakyat Malaysia (GERAKAN) in 2007, Shaziman was promoted as the new Minister of Energy, Water and Communications on 18 March 2008.

Views on the Malaysian blogsphere 
Since assuming the role of Deputy Minister of Energy, Water and Communications in 2004, Shaziman has expressed views against anonymous bloggers whom he accuses of "[spreading] negative or malicious content on the Internet" which "could harm the country's security". In a weekly Parliament meeting on 23 August 2006, Shaziman branded anonymous bloggers "penembak curi", a Malay term for "snipers", and challenged said bloggers to step forth and debate issues they are dissatisfied with:

In a later Parliament meeting held on 4 April 2007, Shaziman expressed the idea of compulsory registration for bloggers whose blogs are hosted on local servers, one of several measures the Government was considering to curb publication of malicious materials on the Internet, adding the ministry does not have any problem with bloggers who identified themselves but reiterating his view of welcoming blogging activities. Deputy Prime Minister Najib Tun Razak sided Shaziman, stating bloggers have made the "business of government more challenging" and in certain cases, caused unnecessary distraction.

Shaziman's suggestion on 4 April drew flak from a member of the Opposition, as well as two prominent bloggers, Jeff Ooi and Ahiruddin Attan, both of whom have been sued by the New Straits Times Press in January 2007. Democratic Action Party (DAP) leader Lim Kit Siang, who interjected when Shaziman was speaking in Parliament, claimed the government ministries' negative view of bloggers "reflected their lack of understanding about information flow" when foreign politicians already have their own blogs. Blogger and activist Marina Mahathir stated the move will only ridicule the government in the international community and told the Government to "get real", while Ahiruddin has stated the proposed measure undermines the country's no-censorship policy with regards to the Internet, and creates fear among bloggers, who will in turn decide to host their blogs overseas. Jeff Ooi questioned the need for blogger registration when a Communications and Multimedia Content Forum dealing with complaints by any party was already put in place by the Malaysian Communications and Multimedia Commission (MCMC) since the introduction of the Communications and Multimedia Act in 1998, and claims the proposal goes against global trends and will stifle development of local web content.

Election results

Honours
 :
 Knight Companion of the Order of Loyalty to Negeri Sembilan (DSNS) – Dato' (2002)
 :
 Grand Commander of the Exalted Order of Malacca (DGSM) – Datuk Seri (2010)
 :
 Knight Grand Commander of the Order of the Perak State Crown (SPMP) – Dato' Seri (2012)

See also

Tampin (federal constituency)

References

 
 

1964 births
Living people
People from Ipoh
People from Perak
Malaysian people of Malay descent
Malaysian civil engineers
Malaysian people of Minangkabau descent
People from Negeri Sembilan
Malaysian Muslims
United Malays National Organisation politicians
Government ministers of Malaysia
Members of the Dewan Rakyat
Trine University alumni
21st-century Malaysian politicians